Frederik Veuchelen (born 4 September 1978 in Korbeek-Lo) is a Belgian former professional road bicycle racer, who competed professionally between 2004 and 2017 for the , , and  teams.

Major results

2003
 1st Memorial Van Coningsloo
 8th Internationale Wielertrofee Jong Maar Moedig
2005
 6th Overall Tour of Britain
 7th Overall Rheinland-Pfalz Rundfahrt
2006
 1st Dwars door Vlaanderen
 4th Halle–Ingooigem
2007
 3rd Grote Prijs Gerrie Knetemann
 10th Grand Prix de Fourmies
2008
 2nd Grand Prix d'Ouverture La Marseillaise
 6th Overall Étoile de Bessèges
 8th Overall Tour of Britain
 10th Overall Circuit de Lorraine
 10th Sparkassen Giro Bochum
2009
 6th Druivenkoers Overijse
2010
 3rd Road race, National Road Championships
 8th Druivenkoers Overijse
2011
 8th Halle–Ingooigem
2012
 1st  Mountains classification Paris–Nice
 6th Overall Étoile de Bessèges
2013
 2nd Tour du Finistère
2014
 7th Cholet-Pays de Loire
 9th Overall Étoile de Bessèges
 9th Grote Prijs Stad Zottegem
2015
 1st Mountains classification Bayern Rundfahrt
2017
 8th GP Paul Borremans Viane-Geraardsbergen

References

External links

1978 births
Living people
Belgian male cyclists
Cyclists from Flemish Brabant
People from Bierbeek